Joseph Gaudentius Anderson (September 30, 1865 – July 2, 1927) was an American Roman Catholic bishop.

Biography
Born in Boston, Massachusetts on September 30, 1865, Anderson was ordained a priest for the Roman Catholic Archdiocese of Boston on May 20, 1892. On April 29, 1909, he was appointed titular bishop of Myrina and auxiliary bishop of the Boston Archdiocese. He was ordained bishop on July 27, 1909, and died in Boston on July 2, 1927, while still in office.

Notes

1865 births
1927 deaths
20th-century Roman Catholic bishops in the United States
Clergy from Boston